Melincourt is the second novel of Thomas Love Peacock, published in 1817. It is based on the "idea of an orang-outang mimicking humanity" (see James Burnett, Lord Monboddo).  An orangutan called Sir Oran Haut-Ton is put forward as a candidate for election as a Member of Parliament.

References

Attribution

External links
Excerpts from Melincourt, at the T. L. Peacock Society
 1896 edition from Google Books

1817 British novels
Novels about elections
Novels by Thomas Love Peacock
Fictional orangutans
British satirical novels
Political satire novels